Kelly Flint (November 15, 1911July 4, 2000) was an American film actress. She appeared in several films in the 1940s.

Modern viewers will remember Flint's appearance as the tall, brunette femme fatale in the Three Stooges 1944 comedy No Dough Boys. Flint was one of the oldest living female actresses to appear with the comedy trio during their prime years (1934–1945) before her death in 2000.

Selected filmography
 The Roosevelt Story (1947)
 No Dough Boys (1944)

External links

1911 births
2000 deaths
American film actresses
20th-century American actresses